Senator Simpson may refer to:

Members of the United States Senate
Alan Simpson (American politician) (born 1931), U.S. Senator from Wyoming from 1979 to 1997
Milward Simpson (1897–1993), U.S. Senator from Wyoming from 1962 to 1967

United States state senate members
Alexander Simpson (politician) (1872–1953), New Jersey State Senate
Daniel R. Simpson (1927–2015), North Carolina State Senate
Deborah Simpson (fl. 2000s–2010s), Maine State Senate
Edward B. Simpson (1835–1915), Wisconsin State Senate
F. Gary Simpson (fl. 1990s–2010s), Delaware State Senate
Frank Simpson (politician) (born 1945), Oklahoma State Senate
George W. Simpson (1870–1951), New York State Senate
Philemon Simpson (1819–1895), Wisconsin State Senate
Richard F. Simpson (1798–1882), South Carolina State Senate
Vi Simpson (born 1946), Indiana State Senate
William T. Simpson (1886–1980), New York State Senate
Wilton Simpson (born 1966), Florida State Senate